The Los Angeles St. David’s Day Festival was an annual arts and cultural festival held in Los Angeles, California. It typically took place during the first weekend of March, and attracted Welsh ex-pats and Welsh descendants from all over the United States. Activities included Welsh and other Celtic music, genealogy, food and drink, Welsh language classes, cultural exhibits, Welsh authors, crafts, and children's activities.

The festival was founded by Lorin Morgan-Richards, produced by the Welsh League of Southern California, and was one of the largest Welsh festivals in America. Past headling acts included Siobhan Owen, Meinir Gwilym, and Poxy Boggards.

History
The West Coast Eisteddfod, the first Welsh festival in Los Angeles since 1925, took place September 23–25, 2011, attracting over 2,000 attendees. The event was coordinated by A Raven Above Press and the Meriweather Lewis Memorial Eisteddfod Foundation. In December 2012, the Los Angeles Welsh Presbyterian Church, a major cultural landmark that served the Welsh community for over 100 years, closed its doors. With the success of the festival and untimely closure of the church, Lorin Morgan-Richards of A Raven Above Press began re-building the festival to ensure the Welsh community had a cultural presence. In 2013, coinciding with the Los Angeles St. David’s Day Festival, Richard Burton received a posthumous star on the Hollywood Walk of Fame. The induction, supported by a Western Mail campaign, included appearances by Michael Sheen, Ioan Gruffudd, and Richard Burton’s family. The 2013 event featuring Siobhan Owen was captured on film in Do Ye the Little Things in Life: St. David's Day Festival-National Day of Wales 2013.

Following the 2014 event, Lorin Morgan-Richards called on active members of the community to form the Welsh League of Southern California to build on what had been achieved. While Richards stepped aside, Peter Anthony Freeman was elected President and spoke of the importance of the event: “The celebration of Saint David’s is more than commemorating the life of an ancient monk. This is a celebration and a reminder of where we come from. One of the greatest features of America is that it does not ask us to abandon our culture, rather we are asked to contribute our culture, so that the whole may become greater than the sum of the parts.”

On October 10, 2015, the WLSC with involvement by Marco Marenghi held several meetups including their second Gymanfa Ganu at the Los Angeles Welsh Presbyterian Church featuring soprano Cherie Hill and poet Hilary Wyn Williams (mother of Thomas Dekker). The St. David's Day Festival meanwhile was held at the Mayflower Club in North Hollywood for both 2015 and 2016.

In the fall of 2016, it was announced an informal breakup of the league as Peter Anthony Freeman resigned from his position to retire in Wales.

References

External links
 Welsh League of Southern California

Music festivals in Los Angeles
Welsh-American history
Tourist attractions in Los Angeles
Celtic music festivals
Saint David's Day